Bleach Green is a railway junction located in Newtownabbey where the Belfast to Larne railway line diverges from the Belfast to Derry route. The Bleach Green Junction is the only burrowing junction in the whole of Ireland.

History
Bleach Green railway station opened in 1925 and closed in 1977. Today no trace remains of the halt, though the Larne-bound platform survived until the line was re-laid in 2006.  The Junction lies 3/4 of a mile to the North of Whiteabbey Station.

The Viaducts being on the Greenisland Loop line were referred to as the "Greenisland Viaducts" and were used in poster promotion campaign by London Midland and Scottish Railways in 1924.

Viaduct
There is a viaduct located at Bleach Green, which was completed in 1933 to allow trains to run between Belfast York Road Station and Ballymena without having to reverse at Greenisland (then Carrickfergus Junction). It was designed by Freeman Wills Crofts, shortly before he retired from Engineering to become a full time author. The viaduct was repainted and the junction relaid in 2001 for the reopening of the railway line between Belfast and Antrim.

Three smaller concrete arches carry the lines over Glenville Road. The one carrying the Larne-bound line was completed in 1931, the once carrying the lines to and from Derry in 1932, and the one carrying the line from Larne to Belfast in 1933.

See also
 Belfast–Larne railway line

References

Rail infrastructure in Northern Ireland
Rail junctions in Northern Ireland
Transport in County Antrim
Railway bridges in Northern Ireland
Bridges in Northern Ireland
Buildings and structures in County Antrim